Tank Commando is a 1959 American war film produced, directed and written by Burt Topper. American International Pictures released the film as a double feature with Operation Dames.

Premise
During the Italian campaign, the United States Army sends out a demolition team to discover how the Germans are reinforcing their positions.  The team is led to its destination by an Italian boy.

Cast
 Donato Farretta  ...  Diano   
 Robert Barron  ...  Lt. Jim Blaine   
 Maggie Lawrence  ...  Jean, the nurse   
 Wally Campo  ...  Pvt. Sonny Lazzotti   
 Jack B. Sowards  ...  Pvt. Todd   
 Leo V. Matranga  ...  Shorty  
 Anthony Rich  ...  Sands, a soldier    
 Larry Hudson  ...  Capt. Praxton   
 Maria Monay  ...  Italian Woman 
 Carmen D'Antonio ... Teresa (segment "Tessie") 
 David Addis ... Clifton, a soldier 
 Russ Prescott ... Taylor, a soldier 
 Freddie Roberto ... captured Italian traitor 
 Jerry Lear ... Bartender 
 Fred Gavlin ... German soldier 
 Joan Connors ... prostitute 
 Larry Shuttleworth ... a Sergeant  
 Lee Redman ... a G.I.

Uncredited

 Norberto Kerner ... German soldier 
 Dan Pelter ... Stritch

Production
 Co-Producer ... Samuel Z Arkoff
 Co-Producer ... James H Nicholson
 Writer, Director and Producer ... Burt Topper
 Musical Director ... Ronald Stein
 Cinematography ... John M Nikolaus Jr.
 Film Editor ... Asa Boyd Clark
 Art Director ... Daniel Haller
 Makeup Artist ... Bob Mark
 Production Manager ... Willard Kirkham
 Second Unit and Assistant Director ... Richard M Rubin
 Sound Mixer ... Al Overton
 Sound Effects ... Josef von  Stroheim -
 Electrician ... Lee Cannon
 Head Grip ... Charles Hannawalt
 Cameraman ... Kay Norton
 Wardrobe ... Gene Martin
 Supervising Film Editor ... Ronald Sinclair
 Assistant Editor ... Paul Wittenberg
 Musical Lyrics ... Ronald Stein
 Script Supervisor ... Joe Franklin
 Dialogue Director ... Don Laffer

References

External links

Review of film at Variety

1959 films
1959 war films
American International Pictures films
American black-and-white films
Italian Campaign of World War II films
Films directed by Burt Topper
Films produced by Burt Topper
Films scored by Ronald Stein
1950s English-language films